Chléb a písně is a 1971 Czechoslovak film. The film starred Josef Kemr.

References

External links
 Chléb a písně at the Czech Film Database (in Czech)

1971 films
Czechoslovak drama films
1970s Czech-language films
Czech historical drama films
1970s Czech films